Lusarat  is a village in the Vedi Municipality of the Ararat Province of Armenia. It is situated adjacent to the Armenia–Turkey border. Azerbaijanis lived with the Armenians in the village before the exodus of Azerbaijanis from Armenia after the outbreak of the Nagorno-Karabakh conflict.

Name 
The village was previously known until 1968 as Khor Virap or Shikhlar.

Monuments 
In the village is a statue of an early 20th-century Armenian fedayi; armed defensive militia units that voluntarily defended the territory from outside forces.

The Khor Virap Monastery is also located close to the village.

Gallery

References

External links 
 
 World Gazeteer: Armenia – World-Gazetteer.com
 
 

Populated places in Ararat Province